Violent Religion is the first album by the band Chainsaw Kittens, released in 1990.

"She's Gone Mad" was covered by The Flaming Lips.

Track listing
All tracks written by Tyson Meade, except where noted.
"Bloodstorm" (Tyson Meade, Kevin McElhaney, Mark Metzger) – 2:08
"Skinned Knees (Kitten Theme)" – 1:41
"Boyfriend Song" – 4:00
"Mother (of the Ancient Birth)" – 3:46
"I'm Waiting (Leanne's Song)" (Tyson Meade, Mark Metzger) – 2:54
"Here at the End" – 3:46
"Bliss (We're Small)" (Tyson Meade, Mark Metzger) – 4:00
"Feel Like a Drugstore" – 3:56
"Savior Boyfriend Collides" – 4:23
"Violent Religion" – 4:36
"Death-Out at Party Central" (Tyson Meade, Kevin McElhaney, Mark Metzger) – 5:10
"She's Gone Mad" - 4:08

Personnel
Tyson Meade – vocals, guitar
Mark Metzger – guitar
Trent Bell – guitar
Kevin McElhaney – bass
Ted Leader – drums
Ron Getman – piano
Phil Seymour – background vocals

Credits
Produced by Tyson Meade
Executive Producers: Jay Faires and Steve Balcom
Engineered by Robbie Egle, Ron Getman, Steve Ripley and Bill Nuñez
Mastered by Russ Tolman
Arranged by Ted Leader, Tyson Meade, Kevin McElhaney and Mark Metzger

References

1990 debut albums
Chainsaw Kittens albums
Mammoth Records albums